The Taoiseach is the head of the Government of Ireland. Under Article 13 of the Constitution of Ireland, the Taoiseach is appointed by the President of Ireland on the nomination of Dáil Éireann, the lower house of the Oireachtas. The Taoiseach must be a member of Dáil Éireann.

After a general election or the resignation of a Taoiseach, members of the Dáil are proposed and seconded for the nomination of the Dáil to the position of Taoiseach. They are voted on in the order in which they are proposed, and if a candidate reaches a majority of votes cast, they are appointed as Taoiseach by the President in Áras an Uachtaráin. Before 2016, all successful candidates obtained the votes of 50% or more of the house, but following the 2016 election, Enda Kenny was elected with the votes of just over one-third of TDs after Fianna Fáil abstained as part of a confidence and supply arrangement. Since 2016, it has been possible to formally register an abstention in Dáil votes. The Ceann Comhairle casts a vote only in the case of a tie.

The Constitution of Ireland came into operation on 29 December 1937. From 6 December 1922 to 29 December 1937, during the period of the Irish Free State, the head of government was the President of the Executive Council, who was nominated by Dáil Éireann, and appointed by the Governor-General. The Governor-General was abolished in 1936. After the 1937 general election, before the coming into operation of the Constitution of Ireland, the President of the Executive Council took office immediately on the election by the Dáil.

Prior to 6 December 1922, during the period of the Irish Republic, the head of government was the President of Dáil Éireann who was elected by Dáil Éireann.

A breakdown of votes is on the pages of governments formed, while support for unsuccessful candidates is noted below.

References

Politics of the Republic of Ireland
Government of the Republic of Ireland
Political history of Ireland